The 1990–91 Pittsburgh Penguins season was the Penguins 24th season in the NHL, and they were coming off of a disappointing 1989–90 season, having finished one point behind the New York Islanders for the final playoff spot in the Patrick Division, failing to qualify for post-season play for the seventh time in eight seasons. The Penguins placed first in their division, third-overall in the Wales Conference, on the way to the first-ever Stanley Cup championship for the team.  Seven players and three off-ice staff members from the 1990-91 team have been elected to the Hockey Hall of Fame. This was the first of eleven consecutive playoff appearances for the Penguins.

As of 2023, the only remaining active member of the 1990–91 Pittsburgh Penguins is Jaromír Jágr. He is a member of Rytíři Kladno of the Czech Extraliga.

Off-season
In the off-season, general manager Craig Patrick, who finished the previous season coaching the club, would name Bob Johnson as the new head coach of the Penguins.  Patrick also named Scotty Bowman as his director of player development and recruitment. Johnson had previously been the head coach of the Calgary Flames from 1982 to 1987. The team also acquired veteran Bryan Trottier, who helped lead the New York Islanders to four-straight Stanley Cups from 1980 to 1983, to help out with his leadership abilities.

Pre-season

|- style="background:#fcf;"
| || September 24 ||Los Angeles||4–1 || Pittsburgh || ||Young ||10,413|| ||
|- style="background:#cfc;"
| || September 28 || Pittsburgh ||3–1||Minnesota|| ||Barrasso ||9,497|| ||
|- style="background:#cfc;"
| || September 30 || Pittsburgh ||7–0||NY Islanders|| ||Pietrangelo ||9,873|| ||
|-

|-
| Legend:       = Win       = Loss       = Tie

Regular season
The Penguins would begin the season without Mario Lemieux, as he would miss the first half of the season recovering from a back injury that he suffered in a game against the New York Rangers on February 14, 1990, which caused him to miss the remainder of the 1989–90 season.

Pittsburgh would begin the season slow, and in their opening 31 games, the team had a 12–16–3, good for 27 points, and nine points out of a playoff spot. As the season progressed, the team began playing better, had Lemieux return to the lineup, and Patrick would make some trades, acquiring defenseman Larry Murphy from the Minnesota North Stars and Scott Young from the Hartford Whalers. The Penguins eventually came into playoff contention, and on March 4, when the team had a 32–30–4 record, sitting in third place in the Division, the club pulled off a blockbuster deal with the Whalers, trading John Cullen, Zarley Zalapski, and Jeff Parker to Hartford for Ron Francis, Ulf Samuelsson, and Grant Jennings. The deal helped the Penguins finish the season off 9–3–2, and win their first ever Division championship, finishing three points ahead of the second place New York Rangers.

With Lemieux missing the majority of the season due to his back injury, Mark Recchi stepped up and had a breakout season, scoring a team-high 40 goals and 73 assists for 113 points. Kevin Stevens would tie Recchi for the team lead in goals with 40, and add 46 assists for 86 points. Rookie Jaromir Jagr had a solid season, scoring 27 goals and earning 57 points, while Lemieux recorded 19 goals and 45 points in only 26 games. Paul Coffey led the defense with 93 points in 76 games.  The 342 goals the Penguins scored was the second-highest toal in the League, only two goals fewer than the Calgary Flames.

In goal, Tom Barrasso had the majority of playing time, winning a team high 27 games and posting a 3.59 goals against average (GAA), along with one shutout. Frank Pietrangelo appeared in 25 games, finishing with a 10–11–1 record and a 3.94 GAA.

Season standings

Schedule and results

|-  style="background:#cfc;"
| 1 || 5 || 8:05 pm || Pittsburgh Penguins || 7–4 || Washington Capitals || Capital Centre || 1–0–0 || 2
|-  style="background:#cfc;"
| 2 || 7 || 7:35 pm || New Jersey Devils || 4–7 || Pittsburgh Penguins || Civic Arena || 2–0–0 || 4
|-  style="background:#fcf;"
| 3 || 9 || 8:35 pm || Pittsburgh Penguins || 3–4 || St. Louis Blues || St. Louis Arena || 2–1–0 || 4
|-  style="background:#fcf;"
| 4 || 11 || 8:35 pm || Pittsburgh Penguins || 1–4 || Chicago Blackhawks || Chicago Stadium || 2–2–0 || 4
|-  style="background:#cfc;"
| 5 || 13 || 7:35 pm || Pittsburgh Penguins || 6–4 || New York Islanders || Nassau Veterans Memorial Coliseum || 3–2–0 || 6
|-  style="background:#fcf;"
| 6 || 16 || 7:35 pm || Philadelphia Flyers || 5–1 || Pittsburgh Penguins || Civic Arena || 3–3–0 || 6
|-  style="background:#ffc;"
| 7 || 19 || 7:35 pm || Pittsburgh Penguins || 4–4 OT || Buffalo Sabres || Buffalo Memorial Auditorium || 3–3–1 || 7
|-  style="background:#fcf;"
| 8 || 20 || 7:35 pm || New York Rangers || 4–3 || Pittsburgh Penguins || Civic Arena || 3–4–1 || 7
|-  style="background:#fcf;"
| 9 || 23 || 7:35 pm || Montreal Canadiens || 5–4 || Pittsburgh Penguins || Civic Arena || 3–5–1 || 7
|-  style="background:#cfc;"
| 10 || 25 || 7:35 pm || Quebec Nordiques || 3–6 || Pittsburgh Penguins || Civic Arena || 4–5–1 || 9
|-  style="background:#fcf;"
| 11 || 27 || 7:45 pm || Pittsburgh Penguins || 5–7 || New Jersey Devils || Brendan Byrne Arena || 4–6–1 || 9
|-  style="background:#cfc;"
| 12 || 28 || 7:35 pm || New York Islanders || 3–8 || Pittsburgh Penguins || Civic Arena || 5–6–1 || 11
|-  style="background:#cfc;"
| 13 || 30 || 7:35 pm || Pittsburgh Penguins || 6–2 || Philadelphia Flyers || The Spectrum || 6–6–1 || 13
|-

|-  style="background:#cfc;"
| 14 || 3 || 7:35 pm || New York Rangers || 1–3 || Pittsburgh Penguins || Civic Arena || 7–6–1 || 15
|-  style="background:#cfc;"
| 15 || 6 || 7:35 pm || Calgary Flames || 5–6 || Pittsburgh Penguins || Civic Arena || 8–6–1 || 17
|-  style="background:#fcf;"
| 16 || 8 || 7:35 pm || St. Louis Blues || 3–2 || Pittsburgh Penguins || Civic Arena || 8–7–1 || 17
|-  style="background:#ffc;"
| 17 || 10 || 7:05 pm || Pittsburgh Penguins || 3–3 OT|| Boston Bruins || Boston Garden || 8–7–2 || 18
|-  style="background:#cfc;"
| 18 || 13 || 8:35 pm || Pittsburgh Penguins || 4–1 || Minnesota North Stars || Met Center || 9–7–2 || 20
|-  style="background:#cfc;"
| 19 || 14 || 8:35 pm || Pittsburgh Penguins || 6–4 || Winnipeg Jets || Winnipeg Arena || 10–7–2 || 22
|-  style="background:#fcf;"
| 20 || 17 || 10:35 pm || Pittsburgh Penguins || 1–2 OT|| Los Angeles Kings || Great Western Forum || 10–8–2 || 22
|-  style="background:#fcf;"
| 21 || 21 || 7:35 pm || Philadelphia Flyers || 5–4 || Pittsburgh Penguins || Civic Arena || 10–9–2 || 22
|-  style="background:#fcf;"
| 22 || 23 || 8:05 pm || Pittsburgh Penguins || 3–7 || Washington Capitals || Capital Centre || 10–10–2 || 22
|-  style="background:#cfc;"
| 23 || 24 || 7:35 pm || Washington Capitals || 2–3 OT|| Pittsburgh Penguins || Civic Arena || 11–10–2 || 24
|-  style="background:#fcf;"
| 24 || 27 || 7:35 pm || Edmonton Oilers || 7–3 || Pittsburgh Penguins || Civic Arena || 11–11–2 || 24
|-  style="background:#fcf;"
| 25 || 29 || 7:35 pm || Hartford Whalers || 6–4 || Pittsburgh Penguins || Civic Arena || 11–12–2 || 24
|-

|-  style="background:#fcf;"
| 26 || 1 || 8:35 pm || Pittsburgh Penguins || 3–6 || Minnesota North Stars || Met Center || 11–13–2 || 24
|-  style="background:#cfc;"
| 27 || 3 || 7:35 pm || Pittsburgh Penguins || 9–4 || New York Rangers || Madison Square Garden (IV) || 12–13–2 || 26
|-  style="background:#fcf;"
| 28 || 5 || 7:35 pm || Washington Capitals || 3–1 || Pittsburgh Penguins || Civic Arena || 12–14–2 || 26
|-  style="background:#ffc;"
| 29 || 7 || 7:35 pm || Vancouver Canucks || 2–2 OT || Pittsburgh Penguins || Civic Arena || 12–14–3 || 27
|-  style="background:#fcf;"
| 30 || 8 || 7:35 pm || Pittsburgh Penguins || 1–3 || Hartford Whalers || Hartford Civic Center || 12–15–3 || 27
|-  style="background:#fcf;"
| 31 ||  11 || 7:35 pm || Chicago Blackhawks || 4–1 || Pittsburgh Penguins || Civic Arena || 12–16–3 || 27
|-  style="background:#cfc;"
| 32 ||  13 || 7:35 pm || New Jersey Devils || 5–9 || Pittsburgh Penguins || Civic Arena || 13–16–3 || 29
|-  style="background:#cfc;"
| 33 ||  14 || 7:35 pm || Pittsburgh Penguins || 4–3 || Buffalo Sabres || Buffalo Memorial Auditorium || 14–16–3 || 31
|-  style="background:#cfc;"
| 34 ||  16 || 7:35 pm || Detroit Red Wings || 1–4 || Pittsburgh Penguins || Civic Arena || 15–16–3 || 33
|-  style="background:#cfc;"
| 35 ||  18 || 7:35 pm || Winnipeg Jets || 2–9 || Pittsburgh Penguins || Civic Arena || 16–16–3 || 35
|-  style="background:#cfc;"
| 36 ||  20 || 7:35 pm || Minnesota North Stars || 3–4 || Pittsburgh Penguins || Civic Arena || 17–16–3 || 37
|-  style="background:#cfc;"
| 37 ||  22 || 7:35 pm || Pittsburgh Penguins || 4–3 || New York Islanders || Nassau Veterans Memorial Coliseum || 18–16–3 || 39
|-  style="background:#fcf;"
| 38 ||  23 || 7:35 pm || New York Islanders || 4–3 OT || Pittsburgh Penguins || Civic Arena || 18–17–3 || 39
|-  style="background:#cfc;"
| 39 ||  26 || 7:35 pm || Pittsburgh Penguins || 7–3 || Washington Capitals || Capital Centre || 19–17–3 || 41
|-  style="background:#cfc;"
| 40 ||  28 || 7:35 pm || Detroit Red Wings || 0–5 || Pittsburgh Penguins || Civic Arena || 20–17–3 || 43
|-  style="background:#fcf;"
| 41 ||  29 || 8:05 pm || Pittsburgh Penguins || 3–6 || Toronto Maple Leafs || Maple Leaf Gardens || 20–18–3 || 43
|-  style="background:#cfc;"
| 42 ||  31 || 6:05 pm || St. Louis Blues || 3–4 || Pittsburgh Penguins || Civic Arena || 21–18–3 || 45
|-

|-  style="background:#fcf;"
| 43 ||  3 || 7:35 pm || New York Rangers || 7–5 || Pittsburgh Penguins || Civic Arena || 21–19–3 || 45
|-  style="background:#cfc;"
| 44 ||  5 || 1:35 pm || New Jersey Devils || 2–5 || Pittsburgh Penguins || Civic Arena || 22–19–3 || 47
|-  style="background:#fcf;"
| 45 ||  6 || 7:05 pm || Pittsburgh Penguins || 3–6 || Montreal Canadiens || Montreal Forum || 22–20–3 || 47
|-  style="background:#cfc;"
| 46 ||  8 || 7:35 pm || Edmonton Oilers || 1–6 || Pittsburgh Penguins || Civic Arena || 23–20–3 || 49
|-  style="background:#cfc;"
| 47 ||  10 || 7:35 pm || Calgary Flames || 1–5 || Pittsburgh Penguins || Civic Arena || 24–20–3 || 51
|-  style="background:#fcf;"
| 48 ||  15 || 7:35 pm || Pittsburgh Penguins || 4–5 || Philadelphia Flyers || The Spectrum || 24–21–3 || 51
|-  style="background:#cfc;"
| 49 ||  17 || 7:35 pm || Pittsburgh Penguins || 6–5 OT || Toronto Maple Leafs || Maple Leaf Gardens || 25–21–3 || 53
|-  style="background:#cfc;"
| 50 ||  22 || 7:35 pm || New Jersey Devils || 3–5 || Pittsburgh Penguins || Civic Arena || 26–21–3 || 55
|-  style="background:#cfc;"
| 51 ||  26 || 7:35 pm || Pittsburgh Penguins || 6–5 || Quebec Nordiques || Colisée de Québec || 27–21–3 || 57
|-  style="background:#cfc;"
| 52 ||  29 || 7:35 pm || Washington Capitals || 2–3 OT || Pittsburgh Penguins || Civic Arena || 28–21–3 || 59
|-  style="background:#fcf;"
| 53 ||  31 || 7:35 pm || Pittsburgh Penguins || 2–4 || Philadelphia Flyers || The Spectrum || 28–22–3 || 59
|-

|-  style="background:#cfc;"
| 54 || 2 || 1:35 pm || Boston Bruins || 2–6 || Pittsburgh Penguins || Civic Arena || 29–22–3 || 61
|-  style="background:#fcf;"
| 55 || 3 || 7:05 pm || Pittsburgh Penguins || 3–6 || Boston Bruins || Boston Garden || 29–23–3 || 61
|-  style="background:#fcf;"
| 56 || 8 || 8:35 pm || Pittsburgh Penguins || 2–6 || Winnipeg Jets || Winnipeg Arena || 29–24–3 || 61
|-  style="background:#fcf;"
| 57 || 11 || 9:35 pm || Pittsburgh Penguins || 5–7 || Edmonton Oilers || Northlands Coliseum || 29–25–3 || 61
|-  style="background:#cfc;"
| 58 || 14 || 7:35 pm || New York Islanders || 2–5 || Pittsburgh Penguins || Civic Arena || 30–25–3 || 63
|-  style="background:#fcf;"
| 59 || 16 || 7:35 pm || Pittsburgh Penguins || 3–4 || New York Islanders || Nassau Veterans Memorial Coliseum || 30–26–3 || 63
|-  style="background:#cfc;"
| 60 || 19 || 7:35 pm || Buffalo Sabres || 3–6 || Pittsburgh Penguins || Civic Arena || 31–26–3 || 65
|-  style="background:#cfc;"
| 61 || 21 || 7:35 pm || Toronto Maple Leafs || 4–11 || Pittsburgh Penguins || Civic Arena || 32–26–3 || 67
|-  style="background:#fcf;"
| 62 || 22 || 7:45 pm || Pittsburgh Penguins || 2–5 || New Jersey Devils || Brendan Byrne Arena || 32–27–3 || 67
|-  style="background:#ffc;"
| 63 || 24 || 1:35 pm || Pittsburgh Penguins || 5–5 OT || Washington Capitals || Capital Centre || 32–27–4 || 68
|-  style="background:#fcf;"
| 64 || 26 || 10:35 pm || Pittsburgh Penguins || 2–8 || Los Angeles Kings || Great Western Forum || 32–28–4 || 68
|-  style="background:#fcf;"
| 65 || 27 || 10:35 pm || Pittsburgh Penguins || 3–4 || Vancouver Canucks || Pacific Coliseum || 32–29–4 || 68
|-

|-  style="background:#fcf;"
| 66 || 1 || 9:35 pm || Pittsburgh Penguins || 2–6 || Calgary Flames || Olympic Saddledome || 32–30–4 || 68
|-  style="background:#cfc;"
| 67 || 5 || 7:35 pm || Vancouver Canucks || 1–4 || Pittsburgh Penguins || Civic Arena || 33–30–4 || 70
|-  style="background:#cfc;"
| 68 || 7 || 7:35 pm || Los Angeles Kings || 2–3 || Pittsburgh Penguins || Civic Arena || 34–30–4 || 72
|-  style="background:#cfc;"
| 69 || 9 || 7:35 pm || Pittsburgh Penguins || 5–2 || Hartford Whalers || Hartford Civic Center || 35–30–4 || 74
|-  style="background:#cfc;"
| 70 || 10 || 5:05 pm || Pittsburgh Penguins || 4–3 || New York Islanders || Nassau Veterans Memorial Coliseum || 36–30–4 || 76
|-  style="background:#ffc;"
| 71 || 12 || 7:35 pm || Montreal Canadiens || 4–4 OT || Pittsburgh Penguins || Civic Arena || 36–30–5 || 77
|-  style="background:#cfc;"
| 72 || 16 || 1:35 pm || Quebec Nordiques || 3–6 || Pittsburgh Penguins || Civic Arena || 37–30–5 || 79
|-  style="background:#cfc;"
| 73 || 17 || 1:35 pm || Pittsburgh Penguins || 4–2 || New York Rangers || Madison Square Garden (IV) || 38–30–5 || 81
|-  style="background:#fcf;"
| 74 || 19 || 7:45 pm || Pittsburgh Penguins || 4–5 || New Jersey Devils || Brendan Byrne Arena || 38–31–5 || 81
|-  style="background:#cfc;"
| 75 || 21 || 7:35 pm || New York Rangers || 4–5 OT || Pittsburgh Penguins || Civic Arena || 39–31–5 || 83
|-  style="background:#fcf;"
| 76 || 23 || 1:35 pm || Chicago Blackhawks || 7–5 || Pittsburgh Penguins || Civic Arena || 39–32–5 || 83
|-  style="background:#cfc;"
| 77 || 26 || 7:35 pm || Pittsburgh Penguins || 3–1 || Philadelphia Flyers || The Spectrum || 40–32–5 || 85
|-  style="background:#cfc;"
| 78 || 27 || 7:35 pm || Pittsburgh Penguins || 7–4 || Detroit Red Wings || Joe Louis Arena || 41–32–5 || 87
|-  style="background:#ffc;"
| 79 || 30 || 1:35 pm || Philadelphia Flyers || 4–4 OT || Pittsburgh Penguins || Civic Arena || 41–32–6 || 88
|-  style="background:#fcf;"
| 80 || 31 || 7:35 pm || Pittsburgh Penguins || 3–6 || New York Rangers || Madison Square Garden (IV) || 41–33–6 || 88
|-

|- style="text-align:center;"
| Legend:       = Win       = Loss       = Tie

Playoffs

Division Semi-finals
In the playoffs, the Penguins would open up against the New Jersey Devils, who finished the year in fourth place in the Division, nine points behind Pittsburgh. The teams split the opening two games in Pittsburgh, and then split the two games in New Jersey, before the Devils won Game 5 at Civic Arena to take a 3–2 series lead back home. The Penguins responded with a hard-fought 4–3 victory in Game 6 to bring it back home for Game 7, where Pittsburgh completed the comeback with a 4–0 shutout to win the series.

Division Finals
Up next was the Washington Capitals, and Washington would surprise the Penguins with a 4–2 victory in the opening game, though Pittsburgh tied the series in Game 2 with a 7–6 overtime victory. The Pens would go into Washington for Games 3 and 4, and post back-to-back 3–1 wins to go up 3–1 in the series, and finish off Washington in the fifth game to clinch the series and advance to the Conference Finals for the first time in team history.

Conference Finals
The Penguins next opponent was the Boston Bruins, the defending Wales Conference champions, and the Bruins, who finished with 100 points, had home ice for the series.  Boston would take control of the series early by winning the opening two games in Boston, however, the Penguins responded by winning the next two in Pittsburgh to even up the series. Pittsburgh would return to Boston for the fifth game, and surprise the Bruins with a 7–2 victory, going up 3–2 in the series and returning home for the sixth game. The Penguins finished off Boston 5–3 in the sixth game, winning the Prince of Wales Trophy and going to the Stanley Cup finals for the first time in team history.

Stanley Cup Finals

Pittsburgh faced the surprising Minnesota North Stars in the Stanley Cup Finals. While the North Stars had a 27–39–14 record during the regular season, they had been red hot in the playoffs, defeating the Presidents' Trophy winners Chicago Blackhawks, the St. Louis Blues and the defending Stanley Cup champion Edmonton Oilers to reach the Finals. Minnesota would continue their hot streak with a 5–4 victory in Game 1, but the Penguins tied the series in Game 2 as the series shifted from Pittsburgh to Minnesota. The North Stars won Game 3 with solid goaltending, but the Penguins rebounded in Game 4 to tie the series as it returned to Pittsburgh. Game 5 was a close, hard-fought game, with the Penguins winning 6–4 to take a 3–2 series lead, and in Game 6, Pittsburgh would defeat the North Stars 8–0 to win the series, and the first-ever Stanley Cup in club history. Mario Lemieux, recording 44 points in 23 games, won the Conn Smythe Trophy as playoff MVP.

Playoff log

|- style="background:#fcf;"
| 1 || April 3||New Jersey||3–1||Pittsburgh|| ||Lemieux|| Šťastný (2),Boschman||Barrasso (0–1)||16,164||0–1||
|- style="background:#cfc;"
| 2 || April 5||New Jersey||4–5||Pittsburgh||8:52||Stevens, Coffey, Bourque, Loney,Jagr||MacLean (2), Shanahan, Kasatonov||Barrasso (1–1)||16,164||1–1||
|- style="background:#cfc;"
| 3 || April 7||Pittsburgh||4–3||New Jersey|| ||Recchi, Errey, Mullen,Recchi||Shanahan (2), Brown||Barrasso (2–1)||16,899||2–1||
|- style="background:#fcf;"
| 4 || April 9||Pittsburgh||1–4||New Jersey|| ||Lemieux||Lemieux, Šťastný,MacLean, Lemieux||Barrasso (2–2)||16,552||2–2||
|- style="background:#fcf;"
| 5 || April 11||New Jersey||4–2||Pittsburgh|| ||Francis, Murphy||MacLean, Driver,Lemieux, Brown (en)||Barrasso (2–3)||16,164||2–3||
|- style="background:#cfc;"
| 6 || April 13||Pittsburgh||4–3||New Jersey|| ||Stevens (2), Jagr,Francis||MacLean, Weinrich, Lemieux||Pietrangelo (1–0)||19,040||3–3||
|- style="background:#cff;"
| 7 || April 15||New Jersey||0–4||Pittsburgh|| ||Hrdina, Lemieux, Hrdina, Coffey|| ||Pietrangelo (2-0)||16,164||4–3||
|-

|- style="background:#fcf;"
| 1 || April 17||Washington||4–2||Pittsburgh|| ||Murphy, Lemieux||Johansson, Hatcher,Iafrate, Miller (en)||Pietrangelo (1–2)||16,164||0–1||
|- style="background:#cfc;"
| 2 || April 19||Washington||6–7||Pittsburgh||9:10||Bourque, Mullen, Recchi (2), Stevens, Gilhen,Stevens||Hunter, Druce, Ridley, Ciccarelli (2), Johansson||Pietrangelo (2–2)||16,164||1–1||
|- style="background:#cfc;"
| 3 || April 21||Pittsburgh||3–1||Washington|| ||Lemieux,Stevens, Trottier||Ciccarelli||Barrasso (3–3)||18,130||2–1||
|- style="background:#cfc;"
| 4 || April 23||Pittsburgh||3–1||Washington|| ||Recchi,Stevens, Bourque||Bergland||Barrasso (4–3)||17,867||3–1||
|- style="background:#cff;"
| 5 || April 25||Washington||1–4||Pittsburgh|| ||Mullen,Francis, Jagr, Recchi (en)||Tippett||Barrasso (5–3)||16,164||4–1||
|-

|- style="background:#fcf;"
| 1 || May 1||Pittsburgh||3–6||Boston|| ||Mullen, Stevens, Errey||Janney, Neely, Sweeney,Neely, Christian, Bourque||Barrasso (5–4)||14,448||0–1||
|- style="background:#fcf;"
| 2 || May 3||Pittsburgh||4–5||Boston||8:14||Stevens, Lemieux, Recchi, Lemieux||Neely, Wesley, Bourque, Janney,Ruzicka||Barrasso (5–5)||14,448||0–2||
|- style="background:#cfc;"
| 3 || May 5||Boston||1–4||Pittsburgh|| ||Stevens,Francis, Jennings, Lemieux||Bourque||Barrasso (6–5)||16,164||1–2||
|- style="background:#cfc;"
| 4 || May 7||Boston||1–4||Pittsburgh|| ||Errey,Mullen, Lemieux, Stevens||Christian||Barrasso (7–5)||16,164||2–2||
|- style="background:#cfc;"
| 5 || May 9||Pittsburgh||7–2||Boston|| ||Stevens, Lemieux,Trottier, Stevens, Stanton, Murphy, Samuelsson||Sweeney, Janney||Barrasso (8–5)||14,448||3–2||
|- style="background:#cff;"
| 6 || May 11||Boston||3–5||Pittsburgh|| ||Murphy, Bourque, Roberts,Recchi, Lemieux (en)||Neely, Hodge, Jr., Sweeney||Barrasso (9–5)||16,164||4–2||
|-

|- style="background:#fcf;"
| 1 || May 15||Minnesota||5–4||Pittsburgh|| ||Samuelsson, Lemieux, Young, Mullen||Broten, Dahlen, Bureau, Broten,Smith||Barrasso (9–6)||16,164||0–1||
|- style="background:#cfc;"
| 2 || May 17||Minnesota||1–4||Pittsburgh|| ||Errey,Stevens, Lemieux, Stevens||Modano||Barrasso (10–6)||16,164||1–1||
|- style="background:#fcf;"
| 3 || May 19||Pittsburgh||1–3||Minnesota|| ||Bourque||Gagner,Smith, Duchesne||Barrasso (10–7)||15,378||1–2||
|- style="background:#cfc;"
| 4 || May 21||Pittsburgh||5–3||Minnesota|| ||Stevens, Francis, Lemieux,Trottier, Bourque (en)||Gagner, Propp, Modano||Barrasso (11–7)||15,378||2–2||
|- style="background:#cfc;"
| 5 || May 23||Minnesota||4–6||Pittsburgh|| ||Lemieux, Stevens, Recchi (2),Francis, Loney||Broten, Gagner, Dahlen, Gagner||Pietrangelo (3–2)||16,164||3–2||
|- style="background:#cff;"
| 6 || May 25||Pittsburgh||8–0||Minnesota|| ||Samuelsson, Lemieux, Mullen, Errey, Francis, Mullen, Paek, Murphy|| ||Barrasso (11–7)||15,378||4–2||
|-

|-
| Legend:       = Win       = Loss       = Playoff series win

 Scorer of game-winning goal in italics

Player statistics
Skaters

Goaltenders

†Denotes player spent time with another team before joining the Penguins.  Stats reflect time with the Penguins only.
‡Denotes player was traded mid-season.  Stats reflect time with the Penguins only.

Awards and records
 Mario Lemieux became the first person to score 500 assists for the Penguins. He did so in a 5–7 loss to Edmonton on February 11.
 Paul Coffey established a franchise record for assists (278) and points (376) by a defenseman. He broke the previous records of 277 assists and 343 points, both held by Ron Stackhouse.

Awards

Transactions
The Penguins were involved in the following transactions during the 1990–91 season:

Trades

Free agents

Signings

Other

Draft picks

Pittsburgh Penguins' picks at the 1990 NHL Entry Draft.

Draft notes
 The Pittsburgh Penguins' second-round pick went to the Calgary Flames as the result of a June 16, 1990, trade that sent Joe Mullen to the Penguins in exchange for this pick.
 The Pittsburgh Penguins' third-round pick went to the Philadelphia Flyers as the result of a September 1, 1989, trade that sent Wendell Young and a seventh-round pick to the Penguins in exchange for this pick.
 The Buffalo Sabres' third-round pick went to the Pittsburgh Penguins as a result of a November 12, 1988, trade that sent Doug Bodger and Darrin Shannon to the Sabres in exchange for Tom Barrasso and this pick.
 The Vancouver Canucks' sixth-round pick went to the Pittsburgh Penguins as a result of an October 24, 1989, trade that sent Rod Buskas to the Canucks in exchange for this pick.
 The Philadelphia Flyers' seventh-round pick went to the Pittsburgh Penguins as a result of a September 1, 1989, trade that sent a third-round pick to the Flyers in exchange for Wendell Young and this pick.
 The Buffalo Sabres' seventh-round pick went to the Pittsburgh Penguins as a result of an October 3, 1988, trade that sent Wayne Van Dorp to the Sabres in exchange for this pick.

Farm teams
The IHL's Muskegon Lumberjacks finished in fourth place in the East Division with a record of 38-40-5.  They lost to the Kalamazoo Wings in the first round of the playoffs 4-1.

The East Coast Hockey League's Knoxville Cherokees won the Henry Brabham Cup as the team with the league's most outstanding record (46-13-5).  They were swept in the first round of the playoffs by the Louisville Icehawks. Don Jackson was named coach of the year, Stan Drulia was named league MVP and was leading scorer, and Dan Gauthier was the league rookie of the year.

Media affiliates
Radio

Some of the games broadcast on WDVE because of KDKA-AM's broadcast conflict with the Pittsburgh Pirates.

Television

References

 National Hockey League Guide & Record Book 2007

External links
 Player stats at Hockey Database
 Game log at NHL Reference

Stanley Cup championship seasons
Pittsburgh Penguins seasons
Patrick Division champion seasons
Pi
Pi
Eastern Conference (NHL) championship seasons
Pitts
Pitts
Pitts